Michael Reese Hoffa (born Maurice Antawn Chism; October 8, 1977 in Evans, Georgia) is an American shot putter.  Reese won the shot put in the 2006 World Indoor Track and Field Championships and in the 2007 World Outdoor Championships.  He also won the bronze medal at the 2012 Summer Olympics in London.  His personal bests stand at 22.11 m (72' 6.25") indoor and 22.43 m (73' 7") outdoor.  In 2012, he threw over 21 meters in competition for the 100th time, putting him in rarefied air in the throwing community. Hoffa was adopted at the age of four.

References

External links

 
 

1977 births
Living people
American adoptees
American male shot putters
Athletes (track and field) at the 2004 Summer Olympics
Athletes (track and field) at the 2008 Summer Olympics
Athletes (track and field) at the 2012 Summer Olympics
Georgia Bulldogs track and field athletes
Olympic bronze medalists for the United States in track and field
World Athletics Championships medalists
Medalists at the 2012 Summer Olympics
People from Evans, Georgia
People from Oconee County, Georgia
Sportspeople from Athens, Georgia
Track and field athletes from Georgia (U.S. state)
World Athletics Championships athletes for the United States
Pan American Games gold medalists for the United States
Pan American Games medalists in athletics (track and field)
Athletes (track and field) at the 2003 Pan American Games
Diamond League winners
USA Outdoor Track and Field Championships winners
USA Indoor Track and Field Championships winners
World Athletics Indoor Championships winners
World Athletics Championships winners
Medalists at the 2003 Pan American Games